The 2009–10 season was the 123rd season of competitive football by Hamilton Academical and the second season back in the top-flight of Scottish football. Hamilton Academical competed in the Scottish Premier League, Scottish Cup and Scottish League Cup.

Transfers

Summer Transfer Window (1 July – 1 September 2009)

For a list of Scottish football transfers in 2009–10, see transfers in season 2009-10

In Permanent

Loans in

Loans out

Out Permanent

Winter Transfer Window (1 January – 2 February 2010)

In Permanent

Loans in

Loans out

Out Permanent

Results and fixtures

Scottish Premier League

Scottish League Cup

Scottish Cup

Competitions

Overall

SPL

Classification

Results summary

Results by round

Results by opponent

Source: 2009–10 Scottish Premier League article

Notes and references

External links
 Hamilton Academical F.C. website
 BBC My Club page

Hamilton Academical F.C. seasons
Hamilton Academical